The Bed and Breakfast Star is a children's novel by British author Jacqueline Wilson.

Plot
The Bed and Breakfast Star is about a girl called Elsa, who is the narrator of the story. She has a sunny disposition and loves to tell jokes, especially when she is trying to cheer up the people around her. As a child, Elsa lived happily with her mum until her mum fell in love with "Mack the Smack", a Scottish man whom Elsa dislikes because he is extremely short-tempered and, as the nickname suggests, frequently uses smacking as a punishment. Elsa's mum married Mack and together they had Pippa, Elsa's nearly five-year-old half-sister, and Hank, her infant half-brother. 

Mack has several jobs that only last a certain period of time, which means that the uncertainty surrounding money is always evident to the children. After several house moves, including in with Mack's mother in Scotland, the family is finally evicted and forced to move in a bed and breakfast hotel ironically named "The Royal Hotel", which used to be a grand place but has become dirty and poorly maintained by ambivalent staff. Elsa nicknames the hotel "The Oyal Htl" due to the missing lettering on the hotel front. Elsa watches her family become more and more disheartened and down-trodden as they are forced to live in one room and stigmatised due to their status, and tries to help by making jokes, but this is not usually appreciated.
Elsa joins the local school but doesn't like it and sometimes bunks off with Funny-Face, a boy at the hotel who she grudgingly becomes friends with. Elsa also grows close to a girl called Naomi, who later gets the Royal Hotel in trouble because of a TV interview. 

One day a great fire breaks out in the hotel (which Elsa discovers) and Elsa saves the guests by waking them up because of her extremely loud voice. Elsa becomes a star and is interviewed by many reporters. Because of the damage caused by the fire, Elsa and her family temporarily move into "The Star Hotel", a very well-managed place. The book ends with Elsa telling jokes to the readers.

Characters

Main 
Elsa - A young girl of ten years old who has experienced moving a lot when she was younger. She dreams of being a comedienne when she is older, as she is always telling jokes, much to the annoyance of others. Elsa is good at looking after Pippa. Her best friends are Naomi and Funny-face. She is named after Elsa the lioness, and has a lion's mane of ginger hair.
Pippa - Elsa's younger half-sister who is four, nearly five. Early on in the book she copies Elsa and follows her around. Due to her age, she often misses the point in Elsa's jokes, can't remember the words (let alone the tune) to any song and can only slam-dance. 
Mack "the Smack" - Elsa's stepfather who is Scottish. Elsa calls him Mack the Smack because he frequently gets angry and hits her. After losing his job and being unable to find work, he and his family are forced to live at the Royal Hotel. Elsa refers to him as "The Big Twitty Scottish Berk in Room 608" and graffitis disparaging jokes about him in the bathroom. He is quite large and strong, with sticking up blonde hair. He spends a lot of his time in the betting shop to earn money for the family, which suggests he could have an underlying gambling addiction. 
Mum - Elsa's unnamed mother who gets very depressed after moving to the Royal and worries a lot. She is a slim brunette with a ponytail. 
Naomi - Elsa's first friend at the Royal, she loves reading scary vampire books under the guise of the dust-jacket of Little Women. She had been living in the Royal for six months when Elsa's family arrived, with her mother and younger brothers.
"Funny-face" - A boy who is part of the "Famous Five" group of hard lads in the hotel. He laughs at Elsa's jokes and lives with his Mum on the fourth floor. His real name is never mentioned.
Hank "the Hunk"- Elsa's baby half-brother who is very large for his age, hence his nickname.

Other 
The Manager - The careless manager of The Royal Hotel. He doesn't seem to care about the guests or their well-being.
The "Bunny" Receptionist - She wears fluffy sweaters and flirts with The Manager, and shares his attitude regarding the guests.
Mrs "Hoover" Macpherson - The cleaner who doesn't share the manager's and receptionist's attitude to guests and likes Elsa and Pippa because they help her out with the housework and are polite and chatty. 
"Simple" Simon - A five-year old boy who tags along with the Famous Five.
"The Famous Five" - The gang which Elsa hangs out and plays truant with after she cannot settle in her new school.
Ms Fisher - Teacher of the special class in the local primary school, who is mean and not particularly inspiring.
Nicky, Neil and Nathan - Naomi's younger brothers.
Naomi's mum - Naomi's mum who is a really good cook and very kind.
The Switchboard - A woman who isn't very helpful (thus sharing the attitude to guests of the manager and the receptionist, although she is more polite) and enjoys Jackie Collins and sweets.

Additional Information
The book was originally named Elsa, Star of the Shelter but it was renamed in reprints to attract a wider audience.

References 

British children's novels
Novels by Jacqueline Wilson
1994 British novels
1994 children's books
Novels set in hotels
Doubleday (publisher) books
British children's books